Kuripapango is a locality in the Hawke's Bay region of New Zealand, situated 76.6 km from Napier and 78.6 km from Taihape.

In the early days Kuripapango was a health resort with stores, two hotels and a weekly mail run.  Both hotels ended up burning down and Kuripapango fell into decline. Today it is a popular tramping and kayaking area. The name "Kuripapango" is a Māori-language word meaning "spotty dog".

References 

Hastings District
Populated places in the Hawke's Bay Region